The 1999 SFA season was the first regular season of the Texas Sixman Football League.

Teams
Damage, Inc., Seminoles', Wolf Pack and Vipers are all in their first year of competition.

Regular season
The first year of the SFA consisted of seven weeks from March 13, 1999, to April 30, 1999.

Week 1
March 13, 1999
Vipers 21 - Damage Inc. 12
Seminoles 33 - Wolf Pack 30

Week 2
March 20, 1999
Seminoles 38 - Damage Inc. 8
Wolf Pack 20 - Vipers 19

Week 3
March 27, 1999
Wolf Pack 20 - Damage Inc. 0
Seminoles 45 - Vipers 0

Week 4
April 10, 1999
Seminoles 33 - Wolf Pack 20
Damage Inc. 25 - Vipers 19

Week 5
April 17, 1999
Seminoles 32 - Damage Inc.0
Wolf Pack 50 - Vipers 0

Week 6
April 24, 1999
Seminoles 39 - Vipers 6
Wolf Pack 30 - Damage Inc. 7

Week 7
April 30, 1999
Seminoles 39 - Wolf Pack 6
Damage Inc. 40 - Vipers 36

Playoffs
The first year of playoffs for the SFA consisted of all the teams making it with 1 round of play before the Epler Cup championship game.

Round 1
May 2, 1999
Wolf Pack 34 - Damage Inc. 18
Seminoles 1 - Vipers 0 (Forfeit)

Epler Cup I
May 16, 1999
Wolf Pack 43 - Seminoles 36

Epler Cup I MVP
David McNeil - RB Wolf Pack

Regular Season Awards
SFA Offensive Player of the Year: Chris Jones - #3 Wolf Pack
SFA Defensive Player of the Year: Oscar Valdez - #99 Seminoles
SFA Regular Season MVP: Ray Garcia - Seminoles

All-SFA Team

1st Team

Offense
QB: Ray Garcia - Seminoles
WR: Chris Jones - #3 Wolf Pack
WR: Jay - #10 Damage Inc.
C: Fred Garcia - Seminoles
RB: Lydell Bradshaw - #1 Wolf Pack
RB: Angel Marty - Seminoles

Defense
LB: Sean Berry - #40 Wolf Pack
DE: Rudy Garcia - Seminoles
DE: Santos Fabela - Seminoles
DB: Ronald Gonzalez - Seminoles
DB: Willie Garcia - Seminoles
DB: Marcus Patin - Vipers

2nd Team

Offense
QB: Shane - Damage Inc
C: Ken Torres - #88 Wolf Pack
WR: Eddie Trejo - Seminoles
WR: Manuel Garcia - Seminoles
RB: Mario Reyes - Seminoles
RB: David McNeal - Wolf Pack

Defense
LB: Oscar Valdez - #99 Seminoles
LB: Lawrence Marion III - #17 Wolf Pack
DE: Nick Valdez - Seminoles
DB: Albert Delgado - #2 Wolf Pack
DB: Thomas Griffen - Vipers
DB: Chris Jones - #3 Wolf Pack

References

External links
Texas Sixman Football League 

American football in Texas